Court Recorder may refer to

Court reporter, someone who captures live testimony in court for the record
Recorder (Bible), a functionary at the Court of King David in the Hebrew Bible
Recorder (judge), a type of judge in some legal systems